Hands of Gravity is the fifth full-length album created by The Hiatus. It was released on July 6, 2016.

Track listing 

2016 albums
The Hiatus albums